The Internacional Femenil Monterrey was a tournament for professional female tennis players played on outdoor hard courts. The event was classified as a $50,000 ITF Women's Circuit tournament and was held in Monterrey, Mexico, from 2013 to 2015.

Past finals

Singles

Doubles

External links 
 ITF search 
 Official website

 
Recurring sporting events established in 2013
Recurring sporting events disestablished in 2015
ITF Women's World Tennis Tour
Tennis tournaments in Mexico
Hard court tennis tournaments